Livio Milts (born 4 October 1997) is a Belgian professional footballer who plays as an attacking midfielder or a winger for Cypriot First Division club PAEEK.

Career

Early career
Milts started his career with Genk and later joined ASV Geel, where he played from U7 to U9. He then went to Sint-Truidense, where he played for 9 season. In 2015, he moved to Club Brugge. He then moved to the academy of Dutch club Roda JC Kerkrade.

Roda JC Kerkrade
He made his debut in the first team of Roda JC on 26 November 2017 in the 5–1 lost away match against Ajax, coming on as a substitute for Mario Engels in the 79th minute. He scored his first goal for the club on 3 December, scoring the winning 2–1 against SC Heerenveen in the 87th minute.

During the winter break of the 2020–21 season, Milts was sent on a six-month loan to TOP Oss. He made his debut on 5 February in a 6–0 win over Jong AZ, also scoring his first goal for the club.

Urartu
On 21 June 2021, it was announced that Milts had signed with Urartu competing in the Armenian Premier League. On 14 December 2021, Milts left Urartu by mutual consent.

PAEEK
In January 2021 he signed for Cypriot First Division club PAEEK.

References

External links
 

1997 births
Living people
Belgian footballers
Association football midfielders
Association football wingers
Sportspeople from Genk
Footballers from Limburg (Belgium)
K.R.C. Genk players
A.S. Verbroedering Geel players
Sint-Truidense V.V. players
Club Brugge KV players
Roda JC Kerkrade players
TOP Oss players
FC Urartu players
PAEEK players
Eredivisie players
Eerste Divisie players
Belgian expatriate footballers
Belgian expatriate sportspeople in the Netherlands
Expatriate footballers in the Netherlands
Expatriate footballers in Armenia
Belgian expatriate sportspeople in Armenia
Expatriate footballers in Cyprus
Belgian expatriate sportspeople in Cyprus